MotoGP 17 is a motorcycle racing video game developed by Milestone srl.

Reviews
The game received average reviews by the media, as the game removed many of its predecessor's unique features and wasn't much of an upgrade overall.

References

2017 video games
Grand Prix motorcycle racing
Milestone srl games
Grand Prix motorcycle racing video games
Multiplayer and single-player video games
PlayStation 4 games
Racing video games
Video games developed in Italy
Windows games
Xbox One games
PlayStation 4 Pro enhanced games
Video games set in Argentina
Video games set in Australia
Video games set in Austria
Video games set in the Czech Republic
Video games set in England
Video games set in France
Video games set in Germany
Video games set in Italy
Video games set in Japan
Video games set in Malaysia
Video games set in the Netherlands
Video games set in Qatar
Video games set in Spain
Video games set in Texas